λ Librae (Latinised as Lambda Librae) is the Bayer designation for a binary star system in the zodiac constellation of Libra. It can be faintly seen with the naked eye, having an apparent visual magnitude of 5.03. With an annual parallax shift of 10.54 mas, it is roughly 310 light years from the Sun. At that distance, the visual magnitude of this system is diminished by an extinction factor of 0.22 due to interstellar dust. It is 0.1 degree north of the ecliptic.

This is a single-lined spectroscopic binary star system with an orbital period of 14.48 days and an eccentricity of 0.27. The visible component is a B-type main sequence star with a stellar classification of B3 V. It is a helium-weak chemically peculiar star and a rotating ellipsoidal variable. The star has an estimated 3.9 times the radius of the Sun and five times the Sun's mass. This is a candidate Vega-like star, meaning that it shows an infrared excess characteristic of a circumstellar debris disk. The system is a source of X-ray emission.

References

B-type main-sequence stars
Spectroscopic binaries
Helium-weak stars
Libra (constellation)
Librae, Lambda
BD-19 4249
Librae, 45
142096
077811
5902
Rotating ellipsoidal variables